Matthew 23 is the twenty-third chapter in the Gospel of Matthew in the New Testament section of the Christian Bible, and consists almost entirely of the accusations of Jesus against the Pharisees. The chapter is also known as the Woes of the Pharisees or the "Seven Woes". In this chapter, Jesus accuses the Pharisees of hypocrisy. Some writers treat it as part of the final discourse of Matthew's gospel.

Text
The original text was written in Koine Greek. This chapter is divided into 39 verses.

Textual witnesses
Some early manuscripts containing the text of this chapter are:
Papyrus 77 (~AD 200; extant: verses 30–39)
Codex Vaticanus (325-350)
Codex Sinaiticus (330-360)
Codex Bezae (c. 400)
Codex Washingtonianus (c. 400)
Codex Ephraemi Rescriptus (c. 450)
Codex Purpureus Rossanensis (6th century)
Codex Sinopensis (6th century; extant verses 1-35)
Papyrus 83 (6th century; extant verses 39)

A Warning Against Scribes and Pharisees (23:1–12)
The pharisees themselves have been silenced in Matthew 22. According to Richard Thomas France, this section shows Jesus as a fierce controversialist concerning the values of the kingdom of heaven as opposed to the superficial approach to religion. Meyer thinks that Matthew's account is closer to the actual directive of Jesus, "although much that was spoken on other occasions may perhaps be mixed up with it"; Heinrich Ewald, on the other hand, thinks that the discourse is made up of passages that were probably original, though uttered on very different occasions.

Verse 2
"The scribes and the Pharisees sit in Moses seat."
Dale Allison states that "'Moses' seat' is ambiguous. It may either refer to a literal chair for synagogue authorities or be a metaphor for teaching authority (cf. the professor's 'chair')." Thus, the New Century Version presents this verse as:
The teachers of the law and the Pharisees have the authority to tell you what the law of Moses says.

Allison observes that "only here (in Matthew's gospel) are the Jewish leaders presented in a positive light: they should be obeyed".

Meyer also suggests that the word ἐκάθισαν (ekathisan, "have sat down") should be read as "have seated themselves", meaning that they have "assumed to themselves the duties of this office".

Verse 5
But all their works they do to be seen by men. They make their phylacteries broad and enlarge the borders of their garments.
Arthur Carr notes that "Jesus does not prohibit the practice of wearing phylacteries, but the ostentatious enlargement of them". He also observes that "it is thought by many that our Saviour Himself wore phylacteries". Their use is prescribed in Exodus 13:9 and Deuteronomy 6:8.

The Scribes and Pharisees Denounced (23:13–36)
While the previous pericope was directed to the crowd and the disciples, this part addresses the scribes and Pharisees, in the form of 'seven woes', a powerful climax to repudiate their leadership.

Verse 13
But woe to you, scribes and Pharisees, hypocrites! For you shut the kingdom of heaven in people's faces. For you neither enter yourselves nor allow those who would enter to go in.

Some manuscripts add here (or after verse 12) verse 14: Woe to you, scribes and Pharisees, hypocrites! For you devour widows' houses and for a pretense you make long prayers; therefore you will receive the greater condemnation.

The phrase "enter the kingdom of heaven" appears three other times in the Gospel, at Matthew 5:20, 7:21, and 18:3.

Verse 36
Assuredly, I say to you, all these things will come upon this generation.
"These things" in the Greek texts are ταῦτα πάντα (tauta panta) in the Textus Receptus and critical Westcott-Hort text but Meyer points out that the reversed reading, πάντα ταῦτα (panta tauta), is also "well attested".

The Fate of Jerusalem (23:37–39)
This last part acts as the inevitable conclusion of the hypocrisy of the leaders to the total guilt of Israel in its rejection of God's messenger: Jerusalem has rejected the call of God's last and greatest messenger and will receive judgment for it.

Verse 39
for I say to you, you shall see Me no more till you say, 'Blessed is He who comes in the name of the Lord!'
Citing Psalm 118:26, echoing Matthew 21:19.

Other Gospels
Luke 11:37-54 parallels Matthew 23, but Luke's version has six, not seven, accusations, and is thus known as the "Six Woes". Luke's version is also shorter than Matthew's. Luke 13:34-35 parallels Jesus' lament over Jerusalem in verses 37-39.

See also 
 Jerusalem
 Pharisees
 Tefillin
 Tzitzit
 Related Bible parts: Exodus 13, Numbers 15, Deuteronomy 6, Deuteronomy 11, Deuteronomy 22, Mark 12, Luke 11, Luke 13, Luke 20.

Notes
The "anise" mentioned in some translations is dill (A. graveolens), rather than this plant. The Pharisees apparently grew it in order to pay some tithes.

References

Citations

Sources

 .

External links
 King James Bible - Wikisource
English Translation with Parallel Latin Vulgate
Online Bible at GospelHall.org (ESV, KJV, Darby, American Standard Version, Bible in Basic English)
Multiple bible versions at Bible Gateway (NKJV, NIV, NRSV etc.)

Gospel of Matthew chapters